Sortobe (Sortobe) is an urban-type settlement in Korday District of Jambyl Region of Kazakhstan. It is located on the Chu River, opposite and slightly downstream from the Kyrgyz city Tokmok. The population of 29,000 is approximately 90% Dungan.

References

Populated places in Jambyl Region